Muhammad Atif Khan is a Pakistani politician who was the Provincial Minister of Khyber Pakhtunkhwa for Tourism, Culture, Sports, Archaeology and Youth Affairs, in office from 29 August 2018 till 26 January 2020. He had been a member of the Provincial Assembly of Khyber Pakhtunkhwa from August 2018 till January 2023.

Previously, he was a member of the Provincial Assembly of Khyber Pakhtunkhwa from May 2013 to May 2018. He served as Provincial Minister of Khyber Pakhtunkhwa for Elementary and Secondary Education from June 2013 to May 2018. He was appointed as Minister for Food and Science and Technology and Information Technology on 20 May 2021.

Early life and education
He was born on 21 May 1972.

He received his matriculation-level education from the Nisar Shaheed College, Risalpur and did intermediate from Cadet College Kohat. He holds an MBA degree.

Political career
He was elected to the Provincial Assembly of Khyber Pakhtunkhwa as a candidate of Pakistan Tehreek-e-Insaf (PTI) from Constituency PK-30 (Mardan-VIII) in 2013 Pakistani general election. He received 16,985 votes and defeated Azam Khan of PMLN. On 14 June 2013, he was inducted into the provincial Khyber Pakhtunkhwa cabinet of Chief Minister Pervez Khattak and was appointed as Provincial Minister of Khyber Pakhtunkhwa for Elementary and Secondary Education. On 1 July 2014, he was given the additional ministerial portfolio of Energy and Power.

During his tenure as minister for elementary and secondary education, he is credited with introducing a number of reforms (including improvements in curriculum as well as schools infrastructure, increasing enrollment, ensuring teachers attendance and enhancing budget for primary and elementary education) in the Khyber Pakhtunkhwa's education sector. He remained minister for Elementary and Secondary Education till 2018.

He was re-elected to the Provincial Assembly of Khyber Pakhtunkhwa] as a candidate of PTI from Constituency PK-50 (Mardan-III) in 2018 Pakistani general election. He received 25,807 votes and defeated Haroon Khan, a candidate of Awami National Party (ANP). In the same election, he also ran for the seat of the National Assembly of Pakistan as a candidate of PTI from Constituency NA-21 (Mardan-II) but was unsuccessful. He lost the seat to Ameer Haider Khan Hoti by a narrow margin of 156 votes.

After PTI acquired a two-thirds majority during the general election in the Provincial Assembly of Khyber Pakhtunkhwa Imran Khan preferred Atif Khan for the office of Khyber Pakhtunkhwa Chief Ministership however, had to nominate Mahmood Khan due to strong reservations and grouping within the ranks orchestrated by Pervez Khattak over the former's selection.

On 29 August 2018, he was inducted into the provincial Khyber Pakhtunkhwa cabinet of Chief Minister Mahmood Khan and was appointed as Provincial Minister of Khyber Pakhtunkhwa for Tourism, Culture, Sports, Archaeology and Youth Affairs. He was given the status of a senior minister.

Since taking over his role as minister Atif Khan has revitalized the Khyber Pakhtunkhwa Tourism department and has provided great impetus to the work of sports and Youth affairs that he was partly overseeing in his previous term as minister for Education.

References 

Pakistan Tehreek-e-Insaf MPAs (Khyber Pakhtunkhwa)
Living people
Pashtun people
Khyber Pakhtunkhwa MPAs 2013–2018
People from Mardan District
1972 births
Khyber Pakhtunkhwa MPAs 2018–2023
Cadet College Kohat alumni